The Essential Now That's What I Call Christmas is a holiday album from the Now That's What I Call Music! franchise in the United States, released on September 23, 2008.  The album has sold 571,000 copies as of December 2012.

Track list

Reception

Steve Leggett of Allmusic says that this volume of the Now! series offers a generous selection at 25 tracks and "will put a little skip, hop and beat into your holiday spirit."

Charts

Weekly charts

Year-end charts

References

2008 compilation albums
2008 Christmas albums
Christmas compilation albums
Now That's What I Call Music! albums (American series)